Vincent Edward Moncrief is an American mathematician and physicist at Yale University. He works in relativity and mathematical physics. Moncrief earned his doctorate in 1972 at the University of Maryland College Park under the supervision of Charles William Misner and worked subsequently at the University of California Berkeley and at the University of Utah. He grew up in Oklahoma City.

A key result (obtained jointly with Arthur Fischer of the University of California at Santa Cruz) was to relate the reduced Hamiltonian for Einstein's equations to a topological invariant known as the Yamabe invariant (or sigma constant) for the spatial manifold and to show that the reduced Hamiltonian is monotonically decreasing along all solutions of the field equations (in the direction of cosmological expansion) and therefore evidently seeking to attain its infimum which in turn is expressible in terms of the sigma constant. A discussion of this and related work (with Lars Andersson of the University of Miami and Yvonne Choquet-Bruhat of the Université Paris VI) may be found in Moncrief's and Choquet-Bruhat's lectures at the Cargese summer school on 50 years of the Cauchy Problem in General Relativity.

Moncrief's own research is mainly concerned with the global existence and asymptotic properties of cosmological solutions of Einstein's equations and especially the question of how these properties depend upon the topology of spacetime. He is also interested in how a study of the "Einstein flow" on various manifolds might shed light on open questions in 3-manifold topology itself. Most of this research involves the treatment of sufficiently small but nevertheless fully non-linear perturbations of certain special backgrounds and includes an analysis of higher as well as lower-dimensional spacetimes in addition to physical (3 + 1)-dimensional spacetime.

References

External links
Website at the Department of Physics of Yale University

Place of birth missing (living people)
Year of birth missing (living people)
Living people
University of Utah faculty
University of California, Berkeley faculty
Yale University faculty
20th-century American mathematicians
21st-century American mathematicians
21st-century American physicists
University of Maryland, College Park alumni